The Mathematics, Civics and Sciences Charter School (MCSCS) is a charter school serving students in grades 1–12 in Philadelphia, Pennsylvania, United States. Founded in 1999, the school is located in the Center City neighborhood and had a 100% graduation rate in 2015–2016.

History
The Mathematics, Civics and Sciences Charter School opened in 1999 with over 720 students in grades first through twelfth, adding a grade every year for 4 years.

Governance
The school is led by a Chief Administrative Officer and a principal. A six-member Board of Trustees meets with the CAO and principal regularly.

Campus
The school is located in Center City, in Philadelphia, Pennsylvania.

Extracurricular activities
Extracurricular activities offered at the school include cheerleading, exercise, sewing, public speaking, Mock Trial, and debating and choir.

Athletics
MCSCS has no gym or other athletic facility, so most practice and games take place at a local YMCA near Girard, not owned by the school. The school basketball team is known as the Elephants, named after the school mascot, an African Elephant. The school currently has no other athletic programs.

Curriculum
The school uses a back-to-basics curriculum. Students in grades 5 through 12 are required to select a school-to-college course of study; current selections are Law, Medical, Education, Computer Science, and Accounting.

As of 2015, the school offers AP courses.

Achievements 
The Mathematics, Civics and Sciences Charter School was named one of the top 10 schools in Philadelphia, including public and charter schools. Also, every Thursday, the school participates in its self-created Homeless Project, in which the CAO and several students go out and feed and clothe homeless citizens of Philadelphia.

Notable alumni
Mike Watkins (born 1995), basketball player for Hapoel Haifa in the Israeli Basketball Premier League

References

External links 

 Mathematics, Civics and Sciences Charter School

Educational institutions established in 1999
Public elementary schools in Pennsylvania
Public middle schools in Pennsylvania
Public high schools in Pennsylvania
Charter schools in Pennsylvania
Schools in Philadelphia
1999 establishments in Pennsylvania
Callowhill, Philadelphia